Consumation may refer to:
 Consummation (disambiguation) (for which the single-m version is an easy misspelling)
 The Consumation, Hurt's 2003 album
 "Consumation", a song by Nina Simone, from the album Silk & Soul

See also
 Consumption (disambiguation)
 The Re-Consumation, Hurt's 2008 album of pre-2000 performances